Regiatidae is an extinct family of grasshoppers in the order Orthoptera. There are at least three genera and four described species in Regiatidae.

Genera
These three genera belong to the family Regiatidae:
 † Micromacula Whalley, 1985 Charmouth Mudstone Formation, United Kingdom, Sinemurian
 † Protochaeta Handlirsch, 1939 Green Series, Germany, Toarcian
 † Regiata Whalley, 1985 Charmouth Mudstone Formation, United Kingdom, Sinemurian

References

Caelifera
Prehistoric insect families